Edward Muir may refer to:
 Edward Wallace Muir Jr., professor of history and Italian
 Edward Grainger Muir, British pathologist and colorectal surgeon